Angelescu may refer to:
Constantin Angelescu (1870–1948), a Romanian politician
Emil Angelescu, a Romanian bobsledder
Angelescu polynomials, in mathematics, generalizations of the Laguerre polynomials introduced by Angelescu (1938) given by the generating function